Big Lovely Mountain is a summit in Knott County, Kentucky, in the United States.

References

Landforms of Knott County, Kentucky
Mountains of Kentucky